North Amityville is a hamlet and census-designated place (CDP) in the Town of Babylon in Suffolk County, on the South Shore of Long Island, in New York. The population was 18,643	at the 2020 Census.

Geography

North Amityville is bordered by the hamlet of East Massapequa (in Nassau County) to the west, the hamlet of East Farmingdale to the north, the hamlet of North Lindenhurst to the southeast, the Village of Lindenhurst to the southeast, and the Village of Amityville and the hamlet of Copiague to the south.

Demographics

2020 census

Note: the US Census treats Hispanic/Latino as an ethnic category. This table excludes Latinos from the racial categories and assigns them to a separate category. Hispanics/Latinos can be of any race.

2010 Census
As of the census of 2010, there were 17,862 people, and 5,289 households with an average of 3.26 persons per household residing in the hamlet. The racial makeup of the CDP was 35.8% African American, 27.5% White, 1.4% Native American, 11.2% Asian, 0.1% Pacific Islander, 12.8% from other races, and 6.7% from two or more races. Hispanic or Latino of any race were 34.7% 6,237 of the population.

The population in North Amityville was 7.0% under the age of 5, 27.0% under the age of 18, and 12.2% over the age of 65. Females make up 53.9% of the population.

There were 5,636 housing units, of which 25.8% were in multi-unit structures. The homeownership rate was 62.3%. The median value of owner-occupied housing units was $339,100. 5.4% of housing units were vacant and 39.4% of occupied housing units were occupied by renters.

The median income for a household in the hamlet was $90,502. 2.8% of the population were below the poverty line.

Education
North Amityville is served by three public school districts. Most residents are within the confines of the Copiague Union Free School District, while other portions are within the Amityville Union Free School District and the Farmingdale Union Free School District. As such, children who reside within North Amityville and attend public schools will go to school in one of these three districts, depending on where in the hamlet they live.

Transportation
The Long Island Rail Road does not have a branch in North Amityville. Instead, residents are in close proximity to the Copiague (LIRR station) & the Amityville (LIRR station). Operating under the Suffolk County Transit, several buses that serve the hamlet include:

 S1: Amityville - Halesite
 1A: Amityville - North Amityville
 S31: Copiague - Pinelawn

Landmark
Sisters of St. Dominic Motherhouse Complex

References

External links
Town of Babylon

Babylon (town), New York
Census-designated places in New York (state)
Hamlets in New York (state)
Census-designated places in Suffolk County, New York
Hamlets in Suffolk County, New York